Lactobacillus is a genus of Gram-positive, aerotolerant anaerobes or microaerophilic, rod-shaped, non-spore-forming bacteria.

Lactobacillus species constitute a significant component of the  human and animal microbiota at a number of body sites, such as the digestive system, and the female genital system. In women of European ancestry, Lactobacillus species are normally a major part of the vaginal microbiota. Lactobacillus forms biofilms in the vaginal and gut microbiota, allowing them to persist during harsh environmental conditions and maintain ample populations. Lactobacillus exhibits a mutualistic relationship with the human body, as it protects the host against potential invasions by pathogens, and in turn, the host provides a source of nutrients. Lactobacilli are among the most common probiotic found in food such as yogurt, and it is diverse in its application to maintain human well-being, as it can help treat diarrhea, vaginal infections, and skin disorders such as eczema.

Metabolism 

Lactobacilli are homofermentative, i.e. hexoses are metabolised by glycolysis to lactate as  major end product, or heterofermentative, i.e. hexoses are metabolised by the Phosphoketolase pathway to lactate, CO2 and acetate or ethanol as major end products. Most lactobacilli are aerotolerant and some species respire if heme and menaquinone are present in the growth medium. Aerotolerance of lactobacilli is manganese-dependent and has been explored (and explained) in Lactiplantibacillus plantarum (previously Lactobacillus plantarum). Lactobacilli generally do not require iron for growth.

The Lactobacillaceae are the only family of the lactic acid bacteria (LAB) that includes homofermentative and heterofermentative organisms; in the Lactobacillaceae, homofermentative or heterofermentative metabolism is shared by all strains of a genus. Lactobacillus species are all homofermentative, do not express pyruvate formate lyase, and most species do not ferment pentoses. In L. crispatus, pentose metabolism is strain specific and acquired by lateral gene transfer.

Genomes
The genomes of lactobacilli are highly variable, ranging in size from 1.2 to 4.9 Mb (megabases). Accordingly, the number of protein-coding genes ranges from 1,267 to about 4,758 genes (in Fructilactobacillus  sanfranciscensis and Lentilactobacillus parakefiri, respectively). Even within a single species there can be substantial variation. For instance, strains of L. crispatus have genome sizes ranging from 1.83 to 2.7 Mb, or 1,839 to 2,688 open reading frames. Lactobacillus contains a wealth of compound microsatellites in the coding region of the genome, which are imperfect and have variant motifs. Many lactobacilli also contain multiple plasmids. A recent study has revealed that plasmids encode the genes which are required for adaptation of lactobacilli to the given environment.

Species
The genus Lactobacillus comprises the following species:

 Lactobacillus acetotolerans Entani et al. 1986

 Lactobacillus acidophilus (Moro 1900) Hansen and Mocquot 1970 (Approved Lists 1980)

 "Lactobacillus alvi" Kim et al. 2011
 Lactobacillus amylolyticus Bohak et al. 1999

 Lactobacillus amylovorus Nakamura 1981

 Lactobacillus apis Killer et al. 2014

 "Lactobacillus backi" Bohak et al. 2006

 Lactobacillus bombicola Praet et al. 2015

 Lactobacillus colini Zhang et al. 2017

 Lactobacillus crispatus (Brygoo and Aladame 1953) Moore and Holdeman 1970 (Approved Lists 1980)

 Lactobacillus delbrueckii (Leichmann 1896) Beijerinck 1901 (Approved Lists 1980)

 Lactobacillus equicursoris Morita et al. 2010

 Lactobacillus fornicalis Dicks et al. 2000

 Lactobacillus gallinarum Fujisawa et al. 1992

 Lactobacillus gasseri Lauer and Kandler 1980

 Lactobacillus gigeriorum Cousin et al. 2012
 "Lactobacillus ginsenosidimutans" Jung et al. 2013

 Lactobacillus hamsteri Mitsuoka and Fujisawa 1988

 Lactobacillus helsingborgensis Olofsson et al. 2014
 Lactobacillus helveticus (Orla-Jensen 1919) Bergey et al. 1925 (Approved Lists 1980)

 Lactobacillus hominis Cousin et al. 2013

 Lactobacillus iners Falsen et al. 1999

 Lactobacillus intestinalis (ex Hemme 1974) Fujisawa et al. 1990

 Lactobacillus jensenii Gasser et al. 1970 (Approved Lists 1980)

 "Lactobacillus jinshani" Yu et al. 2020

 Lactobacillus johnsonii Fujisawa et al. 1992

 Lactobacillus kalixensis Roos et al. 2005

 Lactobacillus kefiranofaciens Fujisawa et al. 1988

 Lactobacillus kimbladii Olofsson et al. 2014

 Lactobacillus kitasatonis Mukai et al. 2003

 Lactobacillus kullabergensis Olofsson et al. 2014

 Lactobacillus melliventris Olofsson et al. 2014

 Lactobacillus mulieris Rocha et al. 2020

 Lactobacillus nasalidis Suzuki-Hashido et al. 2021

 Lactobacillus panisapium Wang et al. 2018

 Lactobacillus paragasseri Tanizawa et al. 2018

 Lactobacillus pasteurii Cousin et al. 2013

 Lactobacillus porci Kim et al. 2018

 Lactobacillus psittaci Lawson et al. 2001

 "Lactobacillus raoultii" Nicaise et al. 2018

 Lactobacillus rodentium Killer et al. 2014
 Lactobacillus rogosae Holdeman and Moore 1974 (Approved Lists 1980)

 Lactobacillus taiwanensis Wang et al. 2009

 "Lactobacillus thermophilus" Ayers and Johnson 1924

 "Lactobacillus timonensis" Afouda et al. 2017

 Lactobacillus ultunensis Roos et al. 2005

 Lactobacillus xujianguonis Meng et al. 2020

Taxonomy
The genus Lactobacillus currently contains 44 species which are adapted to vertebrate hosts or to insects. In recent years, other members of the genus Lactobacillus (formerly known as the Leuconostoc branch of Lactobacillus) have been reclassified into the genera Atopobium, Carnobacterium, Weissella, Oenococcus, and Leuconostoc.  The Pediococcus species P. dextrinicus has been reclassified as a Lapidilactobacillus dextrinicus  and most lactobacilli were assigned to Paralactobacillus or one of the 23 novel genera of the Lactobacillaceae.  Two websites inform on the assignment of species to the novel genera or species (http://www.lactobacillus.uantwerpen.be/; http://www.lactobacillus.ualberta.ca/).

Phylogeny
The currently accepted taxonomy is based on the List of Prokaryotic names with Standing in Nomenclature and the phylogeny is based on whole-genome sequences.

Human health

Vaginal tract 
The female genital tract is one of the principal colonisation sites for human microbiotic, and there is interest in the relationship between their presence and human health, with a domination by a single species being correlated with general welfare and good outcomes in pregnancy. In around 70% of women, a Lactobacillus species is dominant, although that has been found to vary between American women of European origin and those of African origin, the latter group tending to have more diverse vaginal microbiota. Similar differences have also been identified in comparisons between Belgian and Tanzanian women.

Interactions with pathogens 
Lactobacilli produce hydrogen peroxide which inhibits the growth and virulence of the fungal pathogen Candida albicans in vitro and in vivo. In vitro studies have also shown that lactobacilli reduce the pathogenicity of C. albicans through the production of organic acids and certain metabolites. Both the presence of metabolites, such as sodium butyrate, and the decrease in environmental pH caused by the organic acids reduce the growth of hyphae in C. albicans, which reduces its pathogenicity. Lactobacilli also reduce the pathogenicity of C. albicans by reducing C. albicans biofilm formation. Biofilm formation is reduced by both the competition from lactobacilli, and the formation of defective biofilms which is linked to the reduced hypha growth mentioned earlier. On the other hand, following antibiotic therapy, certain Candida species can suppress the regrowth of lactobacilli at body sites where they cohabitate, such as in the gastrointestinal tract.

In addition to its effects on C. albicans, Lactobacillus sp. also interact with other pathogens. For example, Limosilactobacillus reuteri (formerly Lactobacillus reuteri) can inhibit the growth of many different bacterial species by using glycerol to produce the antimicrobial substance called reuterin. Another example is Ligilactobacillus salivarius (formerly Lactobacillus salivarius), which interacts with many pathogens through the production of salivaricin B, a bacteriocin.

Probiotics 

Fermentive bacteria like lactic acid bacteria (LAB) produce hydrogen peroxide which protects themselves from oxygen toxicity. The accumulation of hydrogen peroxide in growth media, and its antagonistic effects on Staphylococcus aureus and Pseudomonas, have been demonstrated by researchers. LAB cultures have been used as starter cultures to create fermented foods since the beginning of the 20th century. Elie Metchnikoff won a Nobel prize in 1908 for his work on LAB.

Lactobacilli administered in combination with other probiotics benefits cases of irritable bowel syndrome (IBS), although the extent of efficacy is still uncertain. The probiotics help treat IBS by returning homeostasis when the gut microbiota experiences unusually high levels of opportunistic bacteria. In addition, lactobacilli can be administered as probiotics during cases of infection by the ulcer-causing bacterium Helicobacter pylori. Helicobacter pylori is linked to cancer, and antibiotic resistance impedes the success of current antibiotic-based eradication treatments. When probiotic lactobacilli are administered along with the treatment as an adjuvant, its efficacy is substantially increased and side effects may be lessened.

Also, lactobacilli are used to help control urogenital and vaginal infections, such as bacterial vaginosis (BV). Lactobacilli produce bacteriocins to suppress pathogenic growth of certain bacteria, as well as lactic acid and H2O2 (hydrogen peroxide). Lactic acid lowers the vaginal pH to around 4.5 or less, hampering the survival of other bacteria, and H2O2 reestablishes the normal bacterial microbiota and normal vaginal pH. In children, lactobacilli such as Lacticaseibacillus rhamnosus (previously L. rhamnosus) are associated with a reduction of atopic eczema, also known as dermatitis, due to anti-inflammatory cytokines secreted by this probiotic bacteria. In addition, lactobacilli with other probiotic organisms in ripened milk and yogurt aid development of immunity in the mucous intestine in humans by raising the number of LgA (+).

Oral health 

Some lactobacilli have been associated with cases of dental caries (cavities). Lactic acid can corrode teeth, and the Lactobacillus count in saliva has been used as a "caries test" for many years. Lactobacilli characteristically cause existing carious lesions to progress, especially those in coronal caries. The issue is, however, complex, as recent studies show probiotics can allow beneficial lactobacilli to populate sites on teeth, preventing streptococcal pathogens from taking hold and inducing dental decay. The scientific research of lactobacilli in relation to oral health is a new field and only a few studies and results have been published. Some studies have provided evidence of certain Lactobacilli which can be a probiotic for oral health. Some species, but not all, show evidence in defense to dental caries. Due to these studies, there have been applications of incorporating such probiotics in chewing gum and lozenges. There is also evidence of certain Lactobacilli that are beneficial in the defense of periodontal disease such as gingivitis and periodontitis.

Food production 
Lactobacilli comprise most food fermenting lactic acid bacteria  and are used as starter cultures in industry for controlled fermentation in the production of wine, yogurt, cheese, sauerkraut, pickles, beer, cider, kimchi, cocoa, kefir, and other fermented foods, as well as animal feeds and the bokashi soil amendment. Lactobacillus species are dominant in yogurt, cheese, and sourdough fermentations. The antibacterial and antifungal activity of lactobacilli relies on production of bacteriocins and low molecular weight compounds that inhibits these microorganisms.

Sourdough bread is made either spontaneously, by taking advantage of the bacteria naturally present in flour, or by using a "starter culture", which is a symbiotic culture of yeast and lactic acid bacteria growing in a water and flour medium. The bacteria metabolize sugars into lactic acid, which lowers the pH of their environment and creates the signature sourness associated with yogurt, sauerkraut, etc.

In many traditional pickling processes, vegetables are submerged in brine, and salt-tolerant lactobacilli feed on natural sugars found in the vegetables.  The resulting mix of salt and lactic acid is a hostile environment for other microbes, such as fungi, and the vegetables are thus preserved—remaining edible for long periods.

Lactobacilli, especially pediococci and L. brevis, are some of the most common beer spoilage organisms. They are, however, essential to the production of sour beers such as Belgian lambics and American wild ales, giving the beer a distinct tart flavor.

See also 
 Lactobacillus L. anticaries
 Lactic acid fermentation
 MRS agar
 Pediococcus
 Probiotics
 Proteobiotics
 Carbon monoxide-releasing molecules

References

External links 
 
 Lactobacillus at Milk the Funk Wiki
 Lactobacillus at BacDive -  the Bacterial Diversity Metadatabase

Lactobacillaceae
Food science
Gut flora bacteria
Garde manger
Gram-positive bacteria
Bacteria genera